Marion Sylvester Barber Jr. (born December 6, 1959) is an American former professional football player who was a running back for the New York Jets of the National Football League (NFL) from 1982 to 1988. He played college football for the Minnesota Golden Gophers.

Early years
Barber attended Chadsey High School in Detroit, Michigan, and is the son of Marion Sylvester Barber. He went on to play running back at the University of Minnesota where he finished as the all-time record holder for rushing yards (3,094), rushing touchdowns (34), and 100-yard rushing games (12) in a career. Those records have since been broken.

Professional career
Barber was drafted by the New York Jets in the second round (30th overall) of the 1981 NFL Draft.

Personal life
He is the father of the late former Dallas Cowboys Pro Bowl running back Marion Barber III, former Houston Texans safety Dominique Barber, and former Minnesota Golden Gophers linebacker Thomas Barber, who is now a defensive graduate assistant for the Gophers. All of his sons played at the University of Minnesota.

Barber Jr. graduated from the university with a degree in youth studies in 2017, almost 40 years after he played for the Golden Gophers.

References

1959 births
Living people
Players of American football from Fort Lauderdale, Florida
American football running backs
Minnesota Golden Gophers football players
New York Jets players
Barber family